"Precious Illusions" is a song written, performed, and produced by Canadian singer Alanis Morissette for her fifth studio album, Under Rug Swept (2002). It released as the album's second and final international single on May 20, 2002. Its lyrics describe a conflict between idealism and realism, and its protagonist refers to her childhood fancies as "precious illusions" that she has distanced herself from with a feeling that reminds her of "parting with an imaginary friend".

"Precious Illusions" did not receive as much radio airplay in the United States as "Hands Clean", the first single from Under Rug Swept. It peaked within the top 20 on Billboards Adult Top 40 chart but garnered little Top 40 radio play compared to "Hands Clean" and failed to chart on the US Billboard Hot 100. However, it reached number four in Canada and peaked within the top 10 in Hungary. The music video for the song is presented in split screen, offering a side-by-side comparison of the mythic and the real versions of a romantic relationship.

Recording and release
"Precious Illusions" was all written, arranged and produced by Alanis Morissette. According to herself, "I went to Toronto to write and I didn't know whether I'd be writing songs for the record alone or with someone. I had no idea, but I started writing alone, and within the first week I'd written seven songs. So it was all really fast and accelerated [...] I'd have my little space station worked out where it was like a keyboard, an acoustic, an electric, my journal and a microphone set up, and we'd record it all onto DAT." After the success of previous single, "Hands Clean", "Precious Illusions" was announced as Under Rug Swepts second single after news that she was shooting its music video. "Precious Illusions" was first released in Australia on May 20, 2002. In the United Kingdom, two CD singles and a cassette single were issued on August 5, 2002.

Composition and lyrics
"Precious Illusions" was written in the key of E major, with a moderate tempo of 92 beats per minute. Morissette's vocal range span from the low note of B4 to the high-note of C6. The song is "dressed up in toe-tapping rhythms, crunchy guitars and downright infectious melodies," as noted by Sal Cinquemani, editor of Slant Magazine. Larry Flick of Billboard Magazine added that the song has a "radio-ready arrangement rife with insinuating shuffle beats, U2-esque guitar licks, and a sticky, candy-sweet hook." The song "examines the pitfalls of relationships. In an interview for Yahoo! Music, Morissette said of "Precious Illusions": "As I evolve and as I grow older, a lot of the things I thought to be truths when I was younger just really aren't, and that's disillusioning. And there is a grief and a loss of sorts that happens when I segue from one awareness to another. And that's what I was singing about on that song."

Its lyrics describe a conflict between idealism and realism, and its protagonist refers to her childhood fancies as "precious illusions" that she has distanced herself from with a feeling that reminds her of "parting with an imaginary friend". Nonetheless, she demonstrates that she has retained a rose-tinted sense of romantic optimism into adulthood, when she expresses a yearning hope for marriage ("this ring") and a husband ("you knight in shining armor"). Flick of Billboard also noted that "there's a pointed edge of cynicism in such lines as "You'll complete me, right?/And my life can finally begin'." He also noted that Morissette "turn that cynicism into a catalyst for letting go of the notion of perfect romance and growing toward positive declarations like 'I won't keep playing the victim."

In a track-by-track commentary about Under Rug Swept, Morissette further commented about the track:

Reception

Critical
Larry Flick of Billboard praised the song for "exemplif[ying] how the artist has actually matured significantly," also calling it a "sane self-empowerment". Flick also noted that Morissette "sells the song with a performance that is, by turns, introspective and chest-pounding." Sal Cinquemani of Slant Magazine praised the track for being "super-catchy," while Chris Heath of Dotmusic lauded the track for "confirm[ing] that, as a songwriter, Alanis is only getting better."

Commercial
"Precious Illusions" became a success in Canada, where it peaked at number four, and Hungary, reaching number nine. In Australia, the song debuted and peaked at number 41, on June 2, 2002. Although only reaching number 79 in Netherlands, the song managed to spend six weeks inside the charts. In the United Kingdom, "Precious Illusions" only reached number 59, becoming her second-lowest-charting single at the time. In the United States, the song failed to enter the Billboard Hot 100 chart but reached number 16 on the Adult Pop Songs chart.

Music video
The single's music video was directed by Francis Lawrence, who helmed the "Hands Clean" video. It was filmed in late May 2002 and uses a split-screen effect. In the video for "Precious Illusions," Alanis Morissette is courted by a handsome prince (played by American actor Lucas Babin) who gives her a diamond and invites her to live happily ever after. However, while the left side of the screen follows the fairy-tale romance, the right side shows more a realistic view: in place of the prince, her suitor is a guy who asks her out by e-mail. As noted by Elysa Lee of CNN, "he does propose, but in a way that reminds us that love isn't all blossoms and butterflies." According to Morissette, "The right side is more me. I'm not anywhere near being in a position to ask or be asked, so it was charming and amusing."

Track listings

Canadian CD single
 "Precious Illusions"
 "Hands Clean" (acoustic version)

UK and European CD1
 "Precious Illusions"
 "Hands Clean" (acoustic version)
 "Sorry 2 Myself"

UK and European CD2
 "Precious Illusions"
 "Offer"
 "Bent 4 U"

European maxi-CD single
 "Precious Illusions" – 4:12
 "Hands Clean" (acoustic version) – 4:07
 "Offer" – 4:05
 "Bent 4 U" – 4:46

Charts

Weekly charts

Year-end charts

Release history

References

2002 singles
Alanis Morissette songs
Maverick Records singles
Music videos directed by Francis Lawrence
Reprise Records singles
Songs written by Alanis Morissette